Zittau (Upper Lusatian Dialect: Sitte; from Slavic "rye" (Upper Sorbian and Czech: žito, Lower Sorbian: žyto, Polish: żyto)) is the southeasternmost city in the German state of Saxony, and is located in the district of Görlitz, Germany's easternmost district. It has a population of around 25,000, and is one of the most important cities in the region of Lusatia (Upper Lusatia).

The inner city of Zittau still shows its original beauty with many houses from several architectural periods: the famous town hall built in an Italian style, the church of St John and the stables (Salzhaus) with its medieval heritage. This multi-storied building is one of the oldest of its kind in Germany.

Geography
Zittau sits on the Mandau River, while the Lusatian Neisse, which forms the border with Poland, touches the city in the east. The confluence of both rivers is located in the southeast of the city. Further south is a tripoint of Germany, Poland and the Czech Republic, and the incorporated village of Hartau lies where the Lusatian Neisse forms the German/Czech border for a short distance. Zittau lies in the Zittau Basin, just north of the Zittau Mountains (part of the Sudetes). Zittau is located right next to the Turów Coal Mine, one of the largest artificial holes visible from space, on the other side of the Lusatian Neisse.

History

The history of the city dates back to a 12th-century Slavic settlement. The area belonged to the Czech (Bohemian) Duchy (and later Kingdom) from the 11th century. It was first mentioned under the Latinized name Sitavia in 1238. It was granted town rights in 1255 by King Ottokar II of Bohemia, who also built defensive walls. In 1319 it passed to the Piast-ruled Duchy of Jawor of then-fragmented Poland, and after the death of Duke Henry I of Jawor in 1346, it became part of the Czech (Bohemian) Crown again. The city's coat of arms still shows a Czech Lion and a Silesian Piast Eagle. In 1346 the city became one of the members of the Six-City League of Upper Lusatia. At that time the city was granted a special title—it was called "Die Reiche" ("the Rich") because of its high proportion of well-to-do citizens. In 1359 and 1422 it suffered great fires. In 1469, together with the Lusatian League, the city recognized Hungarian King Matthias Corvinus as rightful ruler, thus passing to Hungary, and after his death in 1490 the city returned to the Bohemian Crown, then under the rule of Polish prince Vladislaus II. It remained part of it until 1635 when it passed to the Electorate of Saxony.

During the Counter-Reformation, especially following the Battle of White Mountain in 1620, a large number of Protestant refugees from Bohemia (the böhmische Exulanten) came to Zittau, where the Protestant Saxon rulers took them in. Many of them went on to find refuge in surrounding villages, in Dresden, and in Berlin in Brandenburg. Primarily as a result of the near-complete destruction of the city during the Seven Years' War, Zittau's then prosperity is reflected today in only a few exceptional buildings and the cemeteries where the well-to-do were buried.

One of the most important trading goods of this early age in the 16th century was beer. Later in the 18th and 19th century textiles became important too, a tradition common in the region of Upper Lusatia.

During World War II, a labour camp was located in the city. It provided forced labour for Phänomen Werke Gustav Hiller, a truck-manufacturing company (which became VEB Kraftfahrzeugwerk Phänomen after the war, renamed VEB Robur-Werke Zittau in 1957).

Politics

Lord Mayors
2001-2015: Arnd Voigt ("Free citizens Zittau"))
since August 2015: Thomas Zenker ("Zittau can do more").

Local council
The local council has 26 members, the results of the elections in August 2014 are:

Reichstag Deputies

Following the North German Confederation Treaty the Kingdom of Saxony entered the North German Confederation in 1866. This continued after the founding of the German Empire on 18 January 1871. Following this Saxony participated in Reichstag elections from February 1867. Zittau returned a series of Reichstag Deputies until 1919 when the existing constituencies were scrapped.

Main sights

 Church of our Lady: A semi-gothic church that is first mentioned in 1355.
 City Hall: Designed by Karl Friedrich Schinkel and built in Italian palazzo style between 1840 and 1845.
 Flower Clock: A notable Zittau attraction, the flower clock was built in 1907 from a clockwork of an old Tower clock and contains approximately 4800 plants planted three times annually.
 Friary Church: It was the church of the Franciscan Monastery. Their high altar was sacred to the apostles Peter and Paulus in 1293. The main aisle dates from 1480 and was built in the style of late gothic. In the years 1696, 1731 and 1748 prayer rooms were built on the south side of the church. These were special seating areas for wealthy citizens.
 Markt: The main central square
 St John's Church: Originally built in 1230 in the Romanesque style of the Order of Saint John, whose patron saint was John the Baptist.  It was later dedicated also to John the Evangelist.  The building was destroyed in 1757 by Austrian soldiers during the Seven Years' War.  The current building was built between 1766 and 1837.
 Zittau Lenten Altar Cloths, two large decorated cloths which were used to hide the altar during Lent. The big lenten altar cloth (56 m2) from 1472 is shown in the Gothic Holy Cross Church, the little lenten altar cloth (15 m2) from 1573, one of six lenten altar cloths of the Arma Christi type in the world, in the Museum of Cultural History in the former Franciscan Monastery. .
 Several historic fountains: Green Fountain (1679), Roland or Mars Fountain (1585), Fountain of the Samaritan Woman (1679), Hercules Fountain (1708), Swan Fountain (1710), Little Grinder's Fountain (early 19th century).
 Neustadt square with the Salt House, warehouse and stables built in 1511 (the roof dates from 1730).
 Old Grammar School and Dornspach's House, Renaissance buildings.
 Building Crafts College (Baugewerkeschule), a Gothic Revival building from 1846/48 by Carl August Schramm.
 Urban Swimming-Bath (1873) and the Johanneum, a school building from 1869/71, both Neoclassical buildings.
 Heinrich Marschner's Birthplace, a house from 17th century.

Culture
There are roughly 3,500 students studying at the Zittau/Görlitz University of Applied Sciences and at the independent International Graduate School, Germany's smallest university catering to students from nearby Poland and the Czech Republic.

Transport

Road
The city lacks connections to good infrastructure in Germany, but a direct link is planned to the nearest motorway between Bautzen and Görlitz. The town is relatively well-connected to Liberec and the rest of the Czech Republic through dual-carriageway 35 just south of the town.

Rail
Zittau railway station is located north of the town's centre. Passenger services are operated by three railway companies. The first being Vogtlandbahn, which provides a services from Dresden to Zittau and then directly through to Liberec in the Czech Republic. The second is Ostdeutsche Eisenbahn (ODEG), which links Zittau to Görlitz, with connections to Poland, and Cottbus, where connections to Berlin exist. Zittau is located on the Zittau–Löbau railway which was originally opened in 1848, making it one of the oldest railways in Germany.

The Zittau–Kurort Oybin/Kurort Jonsdorf railway with all together four stations within Zittau's limits is a heritage narrow-gauge railway taking passengers from Zittau to the mountain spa resort towns of Oybin and Jonsdorf in the Zittau Mountains. It is operated by the Saxon-Upper Lusatian Railway Company.

Border crossings

Zittau is located close to the point where the Czech Republic, Germany, and Poland meet and there are several international border crossings in the vicinity. Permanent immigration and customs controls were, however, removed on 21 December 2007, when all three countries became part of the Schengen Area.

Germany–Czech Republic
Hartau – Hrádek nad Nisou: Located in the village of Hartau south of Zittau, this crossing is for pedestrians only.

Germany–Poland
Zittau Chopinstraße – Sieniawka: This crossing-point consists of a road bridge over the Lausitzer Neisse River which forms the border between Germany and Poland to the east of Zittau. The Polish town after the crossing is Sieniawka (Kleinschönau before 1945).
Zittau Friedenstraße – Porajów: Also consisting of a road bridge over the Lausitzer Neisse River south of Zittau. The Polish village after the border is Porajów (Großporitsch). This crossing is used for those proceeding to the Czech Republic via the Czech-Polish border crossing south of Porajow. The Czech border crossing is located at Hrádek nad Nisou (Grottau).
Zittau Lusatiaweg – Porajów: this formerly closed bridge was re-opened to pedestrians and cyclists in December 2007.

Zittau is the only city along the Oder–Neisse line where a number of river bridges remain closed as international crossing-points between Germany and Poland even though both countries are in the Schengen Area.

Twin towns – sister cities

Zittau is twinned with:

 Bogatynia, Poland
 Hrádek nad Nisou, Czech Republic
 Liberec, Czech Republic
 Pistoia, Italy
 Portsmouth, United States
 Villingen-Schwenningen, Germany
 Zielona Góra, Poland

Notable people

Ernst Baier (1905–2001), figure skater, 1936 Olympic champion
Max Fiedler (1859–1939), conductor and composer
Melchior Franck (1579–1639), composer
Andreas Hammerschmidt (c. 1611–1675), composer and organist
Gotthard Handrick (1908–1979), athlete and fighter pilot
Moritz Haupt (1808–1874), philologist
Lutz Heilmann (born 1976), politician (The Left)
Henriette Heinze (born 1973), actress
Fritz Hertzsch (1892–1941), Generalmajor in World War II
Christian Keymann (1607–1662), hymnwriter
Alfred Klotz (1874–1956), philologist
Johann Krieger (1651–1735), composer and organist
Johann Kuhnau (1660–1722), composer, organist and harpsichordist
Theodor Leupold, cyclist
Albert Johann Ludovici (1820–1894), artist
Wolfgang Makatsch (1906–1983), ornithologist and oologist
Heinrich Marschner (1795–1861), composer
Stephan Meyer (born 1981), politician (CDU)
Ulrich Pinner (born 1954), tennis player
Georg-Wilhelm Postel (1896–1953), World War II general
Christian Gottlieb Priber (1697–1744), utopian colonist
Heinz Richter (born 1947), cyclist
Werner Richter (1893–1944), Generalleutnant in World War II
Marco Rudolph (born 1970), boxer
René Sommerfeldt (born 1974), cross-country skier
Lisa Tetzner (1894–1963), children's author
Steffen Tölzer (born 1985), ice hockey player
Christian Weise (1642–1708), writer, dramatist, poet, pedagogue and librarian
Dieter-Gerhardt Worm (born 1930), conductor
Albert Zimmermann (1808–1888), painter
Max Zimmermann (1811–1878), painter
Robert Zimmermann (1815–1864), painter
Richard Zimmermann (1820–1875), painter

Honorary citizens
Martin Mutschmann, 1933 (revoked ?)

References

Sources

External links

 
Czech Republic–Germany border crossings
Germany–Poland border crossings
Towns in Görlitz (district)
12th-century establishments in Bohemia
Populated places established in the 12th century